Confederation GO Station is a GO bus stop and planned train station to be built by Metrolinx in East Hamilton, Ontario. The station is named for Confederation Beach Park, nearby on Lake Ontario.

The station is planned as part of the anticipated expansion of GO Transit's Lakeshore West line service to Niagara Falls. Construction on the site began in 2017, however opening of the rail station was delayed several times. In October 2022 construction on the rail station resumed and is expected to be completed in 2025.

History
Beginning in 2014, CN Rail managed the replacement of the Centennial Parkway rail bridge, in partnership with the City of Hamilton and GO Transit. The 84-year-old concrete rail bridge (built 1901 and upgraded 1939) was demolished and a new one erected. This enhancement widened the road and added provisions for an extra track and platform for expected GO Transit service. The bridge work was completed in late 2016.

In February 2015, $150 million was the estimated cost to extend GO Train service the 10 kilometres beyond West Harbour GO Station to East Hamilton, near Stoney Creek. Development of the station site would cost $35 million, and the associated upgrades to the rail infrastructure $115 million. On May 26, 2015, the Government of Ontario announced that the station project was fully funded. Construction began in late 2017 and was originally expected to conclude in 2019. 

GO Bus route 12 began serving the station's bus loop on November 2, 2019, when about 60 parking spaces were also made available.

In April 2020, a public tender was issued for the rail-related work. The build contract was awarded in early 2022. Construction of the rail station resumed in October 2022 with an estimated completion date of 2025. Under the revised plan, a third track will not be added between West Harbour and Confederation GO.

Station
, the site serves GO Transit bus 12 as well as buses of the Hamilton Street Railway.

The future railway station will have an island platform with heated shelters and a canopy which will be accessible via a pedestrian tunnel. The station building will include a waiting area and shops. The station area will have bicycle racks, a 15-vehicle drop-off/pick-up area, 210 parking spaces and stair access to Centennial Parkway.

Nearby landmarks
 Eastgate Square
 Confederation Plaza
 Confederation Beach Park
 Wild Waterworks

References

External links
Confederation GO Station at Metrolinx

Future GO Transit railway stations
Railway stations under construction in Canada
Railway stations in Hamilton, Ontario
Railway stations scheduled to open in 2025